Chhotepur is a village in Dhariwal tehsil, Gurdaspur district, Punjab, India. The population was 1,109 at the 2011 Indian census.

Notable people
Sucha Singh Chhotepur, politician and former state minister

References

Villages in Gurdaspur district